Elvis Presley (1935-1977) was an American singer, actor and philanthropist.

Elvis Presley may also refer to:
Elvis Presley (album)
Elvis Presley (The Hitchhiker's Guide to the Galaxy), a character from The Hitchhiker's Guide to the Galaxy

See also
Elvis (disambiguation)